A counter turn is a kind of one-foot turn in figure skating.  Unlike three turns and brackets, where the entry and exit edges follow the same curve, in a counter the entry and exit are on opposite curves.  When executing a counter, the skater turns outward to the curve of the entry edge, and exits on a curve in the same sense as the turn.  Another way to look at it is that a counter is similar to the entry of a bracket turn combined with the exit of a three turn.  (The opposite combination is called a rocker turn.) 

While counters are sometimes used to perform a simple change of direction, they more commonly appear in step sequences and in compulsory dances in ice dancing.  For example, in the Westminster Waltz, the lady performs a rocker while the man performs a counter turn. Counters also appear on the USFSA's Novice-level moves in the field test.

Notes

Figure skating elements